Stoyan Kolev (born 3 February 1976, in Sliven) is a former Bulgarian footballer who played as a goalkeeper. He is currently a goalkeeper coach at CSKA Sofia.

Career
In summer of 2001 Kolev joined CSKA Sofia and was loaned to Beroe Stara Zagora on a three-month deal. He made his debut for Beroe on 10 November 2001, keeping a clean sheet in a 0–0 draw against Levski Sofia. In early 2002 he returned to CSKA. On 11 May 2002, Kolev made his first appearance for CSKA in a 0–2 loss against Slavia Sofia. He started 2002–03 season as the first choice goalkeeper in CSKA and kept a total of 13 clean sheets in 24 appearances and conceding only 14 goals at less than a goal a game as CSKA won their 29th A PFG title.

After staying for two years with Romanian side Oțelul Galați, Kolev signed a two-and-a-half-year contract with Chernomorets Burgas on 24 February 2010, moving on a free transfer. As a goalkeeper for Chernomorets, he becomes a second choice goalkeeper behind Pascal Borel. After being named on the bench for Chernomorets's eleven games of the 2009–10 season, Kolev finally made his debut at home against Slavia Sofia on 2 May in a 2–2 league draw.

In the first half of the following season Kolev failed to make a single appearance in the A PFG, after he was named on the bench for all 15 league matches. In April 2011 Borel suffered a season-enitz.bg|title=Стоян Колев подписа нов договор с Черноморец|accessdate=7 June 2011|language=Bulgarian}}</ref> On 4 December 2011, Kolev scored a penalty against Botev Plovdiv in a match of the Bulgarian Cup, but it proved to be a consolation, as Chernomorets lost 2–1 at Hristo Botev Stadium. On 23 December, he was named the A PFG Goalkeeper of the Year by journalists. He left Chernomorets Burgas on 16 June 2013.

In July 2013, Kolev signed with CSKA Sofia. On 15 March 2014, he made a rare appearance in the Eternal derby of Bulgarian football against Levski Sofia, keeping a clean sheet in the 1–0 win. He joined the coaching staff following his subsequent retirement.

In July 2015, several months later, after CSKA Sofia was sent to the third division due to the bad financial situation in the team, Kolev came out of retirement and went back on the field. He started as the first choice goalkeeper in the league, while Anatoli Gospodinov plays in the cup matches. In the first 9 matches in the V Group, he kept clean sheets.

International career
Kolev was first called up to the Bulgaria squad at the age of 26. He made his debut for Plamen Markov's Bulgaria in a friendly against Spain on 20 November 2002, when he was a CSKA Sofia player, coming on as a second-half substitute during 0–1 defeat at Los Cármenes in Granada. Kolev was Bulgaria's third-choice goalkeeper, behind Zdravko Zdravkov and Dimitar Ivankov, at the UEFA Euro 2004, remaining an unused substitute in the tournament.

On 14 February 2012, Kolev was selected as goalkeeper for Lyuboslav Penev's first match in charge, a friendly against Hungary. On 29 February, he made a substitute appearance, replacing Nikolay Mihaylov on 63 minutes in a 1–1 draw. It was Kolev's first match for Bulgaria since the friendly with Bosnia and Herzegovina in August 2008.

Career statistics

Club statistics

International statistics

Honours
CSKA Sofia
A Group: 2002–03
V Group: 2015–16
Bulgarian Cup: 2015–16

Lokomotiv Plovdiv
Bulgarian Supercup: 2004

References

External links
Profile at otelul-galati.ro 

1976 births
Living people
Bulgarian footballers
Bulgaria international footballers
Bulgarian expatriate footballers
UEFA Euro 2004 players
OFC Sliven 2000 players
PFC Lokomotiv Plovdiv players
PFC CSKA Sofia players
PFC Beroe Stara Zagora players
ASC Oțelul Galați players
PFC Chernomorets Burgas players
Neftochimic Burgas players
First Professional Football League (Bulgaria) players
Liga I players
Expatriate footballers in Romania
Association football goalkeepers
PFC Lokomotiv Plovdiv managers
Sportspeople from Sliven
Bulgarian football managers